The following is the discography of Burger Records, an independent punk and rock label and store based in Fullerton, California. Uniquely, most of the releases are on cassettes, and artists include both smaller regional bands and larger well-known acts such as Dave Grohl and The Go.

Catalog
Source: BurgerRecords/discog (May 2013)

1-99

100-199

200-299
200 Davila 666 - Singles LP
201 Shattered Faith - Demos CASS
202 Sam Flax - Age Waves CASS
203 Useless Eaters - Daily Commute/C'est Bon! CASS
204 La Sera - S/T + Demos CASS
205 La Sera - Sees The Light CASS
206 Black Jaspers - S/T CASS
207 The Sufis - S/T CASS
208 Hunx - Hairdresser Blues CASS
209 V/A - BRGR PUNK NITE CASS
210 Tiger High - Catacombs After Party CASS
211 The Late Show - Portable Pop CASS
212 Hot Freak Nation - Lifetime to Lifetime CASS
213 Cosmonauts - If You Wanna Die Then I Wanna Die LP/CS
214 Eating Out - S/T CASS
215 Rayon Beach - This Looks Serious CASS
216 Lenguas Largas - S/T CASS
217 V.A. - Kevin & Babe's Wedding Mixtape CASS
218 Thee Oh Sees - Castlemania/Carrion Crawler CASS
219 Soviet - Life Begins At Rewirement OST CASS
220 V/A - Sound City Studios Comp CASS
221 The Breakaways - Walking Out On Love CASS
222 Astronaut Kidds - Let's Keep It Real CASS
223 Tronics - Love Backed By Force CASS
224 Lilac - Christine + 45s & EP CASS
225 Nirvana UK - Cults 2xLP
226 Joel Gion - EP CASS
227 Fletcher C. Johnson - S/T CS/LP
228 Zig Zags - S/T
229 Exurbs - S/T CASS
230 Beaunoise - Ambient II CASS
231 Grass Widow - Internal Logic CASS
232 The Shit - Is This Shit? CASS
233 Off! - S/T CASS
234 The Shit - Hits The Fan CASS
235 The Memories - S/T CASS
236 Dirt Dress - Donde La Vida No Vale Nada CASS
237 Gravys Drop - Buddhist Guru 7"
238 Brian Jonestown Massacre - Pol-Pot's Pleasure Penthouse CASS
239 The Garden - The Life And Times Of A Paperclip LP
240 Matt McCluer - Wishful Thinking CASS
241 The Pharmacy - Stoned and Alone CASS
242 Grape Street - A Date With You CASS
243 The Gris Gris - S/T CASS
244 The Gris Gris - For The Season CASS
245 The Gris Gris - Live At The Creamery CASS
246 Chuck Prophet - Temple Beautiful CASS
247 The Go - S/T CASS
248 Ultra Violet Radio - S/T CASSINGLE
249 The Blank Tapes - Sun's Too Bright CASS
250 Ric Menck - The Ballad of LP/CASS
251 TMAHWK - Demos CASS
252 V.A. - Party In The Tower - Fresno Rock N Roll 1980-88 CASS
253 Andy Human - Freeze CASS
254 Mean Jeans - On Mars CASS
255 The Garden - Soundtrack CASS
256 HOTT MT - Never Hate Again CASS
257 Guantanamo Baywatch - Chest Crawl CASS
258 White Fang - High Expectations CASS
259 Jaill - Traps CASS
260 The Bobbyteens - Back In The Saddle CASS
261 The Guitars - Higher Action CASS
26*2 The Pharcyde - Bizarre Ride II CASS
263 Tenement - Napalm Dream *2xCASS
264 Outrageous Cherry - Best Of CASS
265 Milk N Cookies -  Live at The Whiskey CASS
266 Enjoy - Gold CASS
267 The Eeries - Home Alone CASS
268 Davila 666 - Tan Bajo CASS
269 King Tuff - S/T CASS
270 The Shit - Slef Portrait CASS
271 People's Temple - Sons Of Stone CASS
272 Terry Malts - Killing Time CASS
273 Kid Little - Let Yourself Go CASS
274 Early Dolphin - Return To Whale Island CASS
275 The Memories - Live At Burger CASS
276 Redd Kross - Researching The Blues CASS
277 Bananamou - S/T CASS
278 The Go - Whatcha Doin'? CASS
279 Human Waste - TBA CASS
280 The Tough Shits - Prick Up 07-08 CASS
281 Beachwood Sparks - Tarnished Gold CASS
282 The Wrong Words - S/T CASS
283 The Shrine - Primitive Blast CASS
284 Coathangers - Scramble CASS
285 Coathangers - Larceny & Old Lace CASS
286 BRANES - Perfection Condition LP
287 Sir Psych - The Popsike World of Sir Psych CASS
288 Mild Manners/ESPS - Excuse Me CASS
289 Hammered Satin - S/T CASS
290 The Resonars - Crummy Desert Sound LP
291 The Pharcyde - Bizarre Ride B-Cydes and Remixes CASS
292 Wartella's Strip Show - Hardcover Book
293 Peach Kelli Pop - S/T LP/CS
294 Natural Child - Hard in Heaven LP/CASS
295 The Tomb Weavers - Andrew 7"
296 Teenage Burritos - S/T CASS
297 DTCV - However Strange CASS
298 Spanish Moss - Kelp CASS
299 Schlitzie - S/T CASS

300-399
300 V.A. - The Kitty Comp CASS
301 The Memories - Love Is The Law LP/CASS
302 The UFO Club - S/T CASS
303 Christian Bland - Lost Album CASS
304 Christian Bland - Pig Boat Blues CASS
305 Thee Oh Sees - Singles Vol. 1 + 2 CASS
306 Screaming Females - Box Set *3xCS
307 Denney and the Jets - Slick Rick CASS
308 Uzi Rash - When The Veil Is Lifted/FTP Lite 2FER CASS
309 The Undertakers - S/T CASS
310 V.A. - DJ Don Cesar Vol. 1 CASS
311 Joel Jerome - Babies On Acid CASS
312 Seth Pettersen - Natural Machine CASS
313 Unnatural Helpers - Land Grab CASS
314 Cy Dune - No Recognize CASS
315 Stan McMahon - La Di Da CASS
316 The Half Rats - S/T CASS
317 Merlin's Magic Music Box - S/T CASS
318 Uzi Rash - Coreless Roll Ran-Liner CASS
319 S'Cool Girls - S/T CASS
3*20 Pop Zeus - S/T CASS
321 The Orions - Always Clean And Fresh CASS
3*22 Pookie and the Pookdlez - S/T CASS
323 The Horribly Wrong - S/T CASS
324 Takashi Miyaki - TBA CASS
325 Trin Tran - Dark Radar CASS
326 Lace Curtains - S/T CASS/LP
327 Freezing Hands - S/T CASS
328 Lilac - No Exit CASS
329 Massenger - S/T CASS
330 The Aquadolls - We Are Free EP CASS
331 Swiftums - Don't Trip CASS
332 White Fang - Positive Feedback CASS
333 Holy Wave - Knife Hits CASS
334 Nu Sensae - Sundowning CASS
335 Sitar Outreach Ministry - Crucible of Mutants CASS
336 FIDLAR - The Record CASS
337 Lightships - Electric Cables CASS
338 Velvet Crush - Best Of CASS
339 Painted Hills - S/T CASS
340 Choo Choo Train - The Complete Recordings CASS
341 Uzi Rash - Beast Of Trash CASS
342 Cheap Time - Best Of CASS
343 Nova Verta - S/T CASS
344 Bare Wires - Idle Dreams CASS
345 Paperhead - S/T CASS
346 Ty Segall - Slaughterhouse CASS
347 Thee Oh Sees - Warm Slime CASS
348 Campo-Formio - S/T CASS
349 Fatal Jamz - S/T CASS
350 The Hound Of Love - Careful Houndy CASS
351 The Growlers - Beach Goth CASS
351 The Middle Class - Out Of Vogue CASS
352 The Adolescents - Blue Album CASS
353 Rikk Agnew - All By Myself CASS
354 China White - S/T CASS
355 Sleeping Bags - S/T CASS
356 Bell Gardens - Full-length CASS
357 Yacht Club - Tropicana 7"
358 Hunx - I Vant To Suck Your Cock CASSINGLE
359 Saba Lou - Until The End CASSINGLE
360 Coachwhips - Bangers vs Fuckers CASS
361 MMOSS - 2nd CASS
362 Biff Bang Pow! - Best Of CASS
363 Jasmine Minks - Best Of CASS
364 Slaughter Joe - Best Of CASS
365 Grand Elegance - Cold Winter Dreams CASS
366 Federale - The Blood Flowed Like Wine CASS
367 Paperhead - Looking Glass CASS
368 Wax Witches - Celebrity Beatings CASS
369 Cornershop - The Hot For May Sound CASS
370 Audacity - Power Drowning/Mellow Cruisers 2FER CASS
371 You Me & Us - Paperweights CASS
372 Indian Jewelry - Peel It CASS
37*3 V.A. - Thai Funk Vol. 1 CASS
374 V.A. - Thai Funk Vol. 2 CASS
375 Blowfly - Black in the Sack CASS
376 Thurston + Beck - Mind Warp CASS
377 Gentleman Jesse - Leaving Atlanta CASS
378 Business Cats - S/T CASS
379 V.A. - Wiener Dog Comp CASS
380 Sailors of Neptune - S/T CASS
381 La Luz - Damp Face CASS
382 Cumstain - White People Problems CASS/LP
383 Vision - S/T CASS
384 The Three O'Clock - Bootleg LP
385 Unkle Funkle - Picture Of My Dick CASS
386 The Cleaners from Venus - The Late District CASS
387 Enjoy - Spaceships and Attitudes CASS
388 Groundislava - Feel Me CASS
389 The Memories - Rainy Day Tape
390 Lancelot Exotica - Attack Mix CASS
391 The Brotherhood of the Lizards - Lizardland CASS
392 Masters Of Reality - S/T CASS
393 Lamebrain / Mope Grooves - Split CASS
394 V.A. - Daddy Rockin' Strong: A Tribute to Nolan Strong & The Diablos CASS
395 Cherry Glazerr - Trick Or Treat Dancefloor CASS
396 Burger's *20*1*3 Calendar CAL
397 Bed Rugs - Rapids CASS
398 Big Boys - Where's My Towel/Industry Standard CASS
399 Cumstain - Fawn Spots - Wedding Dress CASS

400-present
400 The Go - Fiesta LP/CASS
401 Dreamdate - 3FER CASS
402 The Growlers - Hung At Heart CASS
403 Burnt Ones - You'll Never Walk Alone LP
404 Paul Messis - The Problem With Me CASS
405 The Lovely Bad Things - The Late Great Whatever CASS
406 The Go - Supercuts CASS
407 The Natives/The Garden - Split CASS
408 The Adolescents - Demos CASS
409 Three O'Clock - *16 Tambourines + Baroque Hoedown CASS
410 Redd Kross - Born Innocent CASS
411 V.A. - Dangerhouse Vol. 1 CASS
412 V.A. - Dangerhouse Vol. 2 CASS
413 Christian Death - Only Theater Of Pain CASS
414 The Weirdos - Weird World 1+2 CASS
415 The Middle Class - Homeland CASS
416 The Flyboys - S/T CASS
417 Salvation Army - Befour Three O'Clock CASS
418 Suicidal Tendencies - S/T CASS
419 The Pinkz - Collection CASS
4*20 Free Weed - Fantasy CASS
4*21 Haunted Tiger - King Kong Songs CASS/LP
4*22 The Resonars - Tripping In Your Coffin CASS
423 Mean Jeans - Demos CASS
424 V.A. - I'm Just The Other Woman - MSR Madness, Vol. *4 CASS
425 Stupid Cupids - S/T *12" 
426 Warm Soda - Someone For You CASS
427 Curt Boettcher - Misty Mirage CASS
428 The Creation - Power Surge CASS
429 Shannon and the Clams - Singles Collection CASS
430 The Orwells - Remember When CASS
431 The Shit - General Ulysses CASS
432 SISU - Light Eyes CASS
433 V.A. - Mike Atta Benefit Comp CASS
434 Dead Ghosts - Can't Get No LP
435 BOOM! - Get A Grip CASS
436 The Garden - Everything Is Perfect CASS
437 Thee Rain Cats - TBD CASS
438 Psychic Hotline - TBA
439 Juniper Rising - TBA CASS
440 White Night - TBA LP
441 Cosmonauts - Singles Collection CASS
442 V.A. - Ambiguous Sampler Vol. 1 CD
443 White Mystery - Telepathic CASS
444 Gravys Drop - Gumball LP
445 The Elephant Stone - S/T CASS
446 Bobb Trimble - TBA CASS
447 The Prefab Messiahs - TBA CASS
448 V.A. - DJ Don Cesar Vol. 2 CASS
449 BBQ - Tie Your Noose CASS
450 Brotherhood of Lizards - S/T
451 Sir Lord Von Raven - 2nd Album CASS
452 The Be Helds - Vol 1 CASS
453 Melted Toys - S/T CASS
454 Tomorrows Tulips - Experimental Jelly LP
455 Free Weed - Bong Pop
456 Summer Twins - Forget Me 7"
457 Free Weed & Unkle Funkle - Valentine's Day CASS
458 The Bam Bams - S/T CASS
459 V.A. - The Taste of Burger Records 2xCASS
460 Glitz - It'z Glitz CASS
461 Traumahelikopter - S/T
462 The Rang Dangs - TBA CASS
463 Bleached - TBA CASS
464 Beach Day - TBA
465 Elvis Christ - And So It Shall Be CASS
466 DJ Kid Slizzard - For The Weed Smokers CASS
467 Street Gnar - Study Wall CASS
468 Colleen Green - Sock It To Me CASS
469 Red Rippers - Over There… and Over Here CASS
470 The Three O'Clock - Aquarius Andromeda LP
471 Sneakpeek - S/T CASS
472 Fingers of the Sun - TBA CASS
473 Games - TBA CASS
474 Night Drives - TBA CASS
475 The Felines - TBA CASS
476 Make Up - Save Yourself CASS
477 Puzzle - That's Fine CASS
478 Conspiracy of Owls - Flexi
478 The Garden - S/T/Everything's Perfect 2FER CASS
479 Cosmonauts - S/T/If You Wanna Die 2FER CASS
480 Lumina - TBA CASS
481 Black Bananas - Rad Times XPress IV CASS
482 Jib Kidder - TBA CASS
483 The Sufis - Inventions LP
484 Wyatt Blair - Banana Cream Dream CASS
485 Sonny Skyes - The Imaginary Friend Ship CASS
486 Neil Hamburger - Indecent in Cambridge Mass CASS
487 Sudden Death Of Stars - Getting Up, Going Down CASS
488 The Smoking Trees - Acetate CASS
489 '82 Crowd of People - S/T CASS
490 Mozes and the Firstborn - TBA CASS/LP
491 Davie Liebe Hart - Exercise VHS
492 Habibi - TBA LP/CASS
493 Free Moral Agents - Live CASS
49*4 Cool Ghouls - S/T CASS
495 David Liebe Hart Band - TBA CASS
496 Night Sun - No Pressure 7"
497 Cosmonauts - Persona Non Grata CASS/LP
498 The Abigails - Tundra LP/CASS
499 Idiot Glee - TBA CASS
500 Preston Whitehurst - Spirit Wagon CASS
501 Gap Dream - Chill Spot/Peter's Brother 7"
502 Miss Chain and the Broken Heels - The Dawn CASS
503 Fletcher C. Johnson - It Rained Something Wicked CASS
504 Dressy Bessy - TBA CASS
505 The Kids - S/T CASS
506 The Shine Brothers - Hello Grief Birds CASS
507 Jovontaes - Paranoia Makes A Crazy Gift CASS
508 Shannon and the Clams - Dreams from the Rat House CASS
509 Jonathan Toubin - NY Soul Dance Night Train CASS
510 Boys Age - Fake Gold CASS
511 The Rich Hands - Dreamers CASS
512 White Fang - Steady Truckin' For Summer CASS
513 Curtis Harding - Keep On Shining 7"
514 Rexx - My New Punk Rock Life CASS
515 Vaadat Charigim - The World Is Well Lost CASS
516 Audacity - Juva Jive EP
517 Bad Indians - Are On The Other Side CASS
518 V.A. - IRMA Japan Comp CD
519 Bart Davenport - Physical World CASS
520 Cherry Glazerr - Haxel Princess LP/CD/CASS
521 Big Eyes - Almost Famous CASS
522 Hunx - Street Punk CASS
523 Lenz - Ways To End A Day CASS
524 Jaill - Cranes CASS
526 Strawberry Alarm Clock - Wake Up Where Are You CASS
527 Frausdots - Despair Gazette Demos CASS
528 V.A. - East LA Comp CASS
529 Exploding Flowers - S/T CASS
530 Thee Goochi Boiz - Fast Food For The Teenage Soul CASS
531 Wet Spots - S/T CASS
532 Games - TBA CASS
533 Gateway Drugs - TBA CASS
534 Hott MT - I Made This CASS
535 Hot Lunch - S/T CASS
536 Wax Idols - Discipline + Desire CASS
537 Lonesome Shack - Slidin Boa / City Man 2FER CASS
538 Sauna - Cheap Date CASS
539 The People's Temple - More For The Masses CASS
540 The Orwells - Other Voices CASS
541 Together Pangea - Snakedog CASS
542 Warm - S/T CASS
543 Twink - Think Pink CASS
544 Part Time - PDA CASS
545 Mom - Mom-Comic BOOK
546 Phil Thomas Katt - Nine Lives CASS
547 Honey Bucket - S/T CASS
548 Love Cop - 2 True / 2 Real CASS
549 Totally You - Coconut Heaven CASS
550 Natural Child - Dancin' With Wolves LP/CD/CASS
551 Jerry Rogers - Point Of Contact CASS
552 39 Clocks - Paint It Dark CASS
553 Masta Ace - Sittin' On Chrome Deluxe CASS
554 Cheryll - S/T CASS
555 Gap Dream - Shine Your Light LP/CASS/CD
556 Froth - Patterns CASS
557 Matt Kivel - Double Exposure CASS
558 The Weirdos - Weird World 2 CASS
559 Dream Boys - S/T CASS
560 The Memories - Touched By An Angel CASS
561 The Memories - Breezy Evening CASS
562 V.A. - The Wiener Dog Comp 2 - The Ghoulie Tape CASS
563 The Orwells - Who Needs You EP CASS
564 Free Weed & Unkle Funkle - 2 Sides 2 Summer CASS
565 Boogarins - As Plantas Que Curam CASS
566 John Wesley Coleman - Lizard Of Pop LP/CD/CASS
567 Enjoy - Mist CASS
568 Puzzle - About You CASS
569 V.A. - Tribute To Velvet Underground's White Light/White Heat CASS/LP
570 East Village - Drop Out CASS
571 Extra Classic - Showcase CASS
572 The Golden Animals - Hear Eye GO CASS
573 Preston Whitehurst - Spirit Wagon CASS
574 Sitar Outreach Ministry - Rise of the Flowers CASS
575 Denney and the Jets - Mexican Coke LP/CD/CASS
576 Joel Jerome - Psychedelic Thriftstore Folk CASS
577 John Krautner - Fun With Gum Vol 1 LP/CD/CASS
578 V.A. - Kiss of the Damned OST CASS
579 Cedell Davis - Feels Like I'm Doing Something Wrong CASS
580 Famous Renfroe - Children CASS
581 Hi Rhythm - On The Loose CASS
582 Junior Kimbrough - All Night Long CASS
583 Townes Van Zandt - Townes Van Zandt CASS
584 The Freeks - Full On CASS
585 V.A. - I Need You Bad Comp CASS
586 F'ke Blood - The Band That Bled Real Blood CASS
587 Today's Hits - TBA CASS
588 Jail Weddings - Meltdown - A Declaration Of Unpopular Emotion CASS
589 V.A. - Cumstain vs Pookie and the Poodlez - Split CASS
590 V.A. - Now That's What I Call Burger Vol 1 DIGI
591 Conspiracy of Owls - Puzzle People / Ancient Robots 7"
592 Michael Rey and the Woebegones - Retrospective CASS
593 Night Beats - Sonic Bloom CASS
594 Melody's Echo Chamber - S/T CASS
595 Jacco Gardner - Cabinet Of Curiosities CASS
596 Blank Tapes - Vacation CASS
597 COLDBEAT - TBA CASS
598 V.A. - Fidlar / The Orwells - Split CASS
599 AJ Davila - TBA LP/CD/CASS
600 Curtis Harding - S/T LP/CD/CASS
601 V.A. - Hits! of Burger Records - Japanese Exclusive CD
602 Frankie Rose - Herein Wild CASS
603 Jackson Scott - Melbourne CASS
604 Cumstain - White People Problems CASS
605 Charlie Boyer and the Voyeurs - Clarietta CASS
606 Audacity - Butter Knife CASS
607 Vex Ruffin - S/T CASS
608 SISU - Blood Tears CASS
609 La Luz - It's Alive CASS
610 The Skabbs - Idle Threat CASS
611 Jacuzzi Boys - S/T CASS
612 V.A. - Now That's What I Call Burger Vol 2 DIGI
613 The Garden - S/T/Everything's Perfect 2FER CASS
614 The Growlers - Beach Goth CASS
615 Together Pangea - Jelly Jam/Wisdom Surf  CASS
616 Gap Dream - Peter's Brother FLEXI
617 The Zoltars - Walking Through the Dark CASS
618 Mr. Elevator And The Brain Hotel - Nico… and Her Psychedelic Subconscious CASS/LP/CD
619 Wax Witches - Centre of Your Universe CASS/LP/CD
620 Mikal Cronin - MCII CASS
621 Pat Thomas - Coasters Riding In The Air CASS
622 V.A. - Cynic Cave Comedy Club CASS
623 Crazy Band - TBA CASS
624 James Quall - The Album CASS
625 Chico Sonido - Nalga Bass CASS
626 Las Rosas - Flower In The Sun CASS
627 Jonathan Toubin - Halloween Mix CASS
628 Burger Calendar 2014 CAL
629 The Beginner's Mynd - S-T CASS
630 Las Ardillas - S/T CASS
631 Los Saicos - Demolicion CASS
632 The Explorers Club - Don't Waste Her Time DIGI SINGLE
633 DTCV - Hilarious Heaven CASS
634 Tiger High - 2FER LP
635 The Pharmacy - Spells CASS
636 Pizza Time - Quiero Mas CASS
637 Unkle Funkle - Supernatural CASS/LP/CD
638 Dude York - TBA CASS
639 Tomorrows Tulips - Eternally Teenage—Experimental Jelly 2FER CASS
640 Today's Hits - Christmas Album CASS
641 The Rebel Set - How To Make A Monster CASS
642 V.A. - Now That's What I Call Burger Vol 3 DIGI
643 R Stevie Moore - Delicate Tension CASS
644 Colleen Green - Milo Goes To Compton CASS
645 Colleen Green - Cujo CASS
646 Frank Alpine - TBA CASS
647 Illegal Civilization - Art Show CASS
648 The Garden + Ashley Calhoun - Halloween Tape CASS
649 Hollyberries - I Wanna Go Surfin With Santa CASS
650 Vox Pop - Single 7"
651 Chain and the Gang - Music's Not For Everyone CASS
652 Circle Jerks - Group Sex CASS
653 Temples - Sun Structures CASS
654 Twink - Lost Experimental Recordings 1970 CASS
655 Heatmiser - Dead Air CASS
656 Heatmiser - Cop and Speeder CASS
657 Heatmiser - Yellow No. 5 CASS
658 White Fang - Chunks LP/CD/CASS
659 Eddie and the Subtitles - Fuck You CASS
660 Shagrat - Pink Jacket Required CASS
661 Thin White Rope - Exploring the Axis CASS
662 The Memories - TBA LP/CD/CASS
663 Twink - Odds + Beg. CASS
664 Young Fresh Fellows - The Men Who Make The Music CASS
665 Street Trolleys - TBA CASS
666 Kim Fowley - Let's Get Blasted CASS
667 Pontiac Brothers - Doll Hut CASS
668 BOYTOY - S/T CASS
669 Shoes - Best CASS
670 Les Marinellis - S/T CASS
671 The Abigails - Songs of Love and Despair/Tundra 2FER CASS
672 Twink - You Reached For The Stars CASS
673 Twink - The Think Pink and Never Neverland Demos CASS
674 Death Valley Girls - Street Venom CASS
675 The Courtneys - Lost Boys CASS
676 Marshmallow Overcoat - TBA CASS
677 V.A. Suicide Squeeze Presents Forever Singles CASS
678 Holy Wave - Relax CASS
679 Together Pangea - Badillac CASS
680 V.A. - Now That's What I Call Burger Vol. 4 DIGI
681 Beachwood Sparks - Desert Skies CASS
682 V.A. - NYE Reverberation 2014 CASS
683 Massenger - Girl Glass CASS
684 Sudden Death of Stars - All Unrevealed Parts Of The Unknown CASS
685 LOOP - The World In Your Eyes CASS
686 Burnt Ones - Gift CASS
687 The Sands - Hotel and Casino CASS
688 V.A. - Beach Goth Party II CASS
689 Margo Guryan - 27 Demos CASS
690 Kikagaku Moyo - S/T CASS
691 Thee Oh Sees - Putrifiers II CASS
692 Thee Oh Sees - Floating Coffin CASS
693 Damaged Bug - Hubba Bubba CASS
694 Traumahelikopter - I Don't Understand Them At All CASS
695 The Rich Hands - TBA CASS
696 Cool Moms - TBA CASS
697 Beaunoise - Ambient III CASS
698 Black Lips - Underneath The Rainbow CASS
699 Pujol - Kludge CASS
700 The Muffs - Whoop Dee Doo LP/CD/CS
701 Pure X - Angel CASS
702 Pizza Time - You Wanna Pizza Me CASS
703 Coathangers - Suck My Shirt CASS
704 Black Sea - Keep Smiling/Optimistic Sigh EP CASS
705 Cementu Umongongo - Extraordianre CASS
706 Strange Hands - Children Shouldn't Play With Dead Things CASS
707 OFF! - Wasted Years CASS
708 Tomorrows Tulips - When LP/CD/CASS
709 Queenie - Luv Me Or Feed Me CASS
710 VA - Deep Secrets Vol 2 CASS
711 Dog Party - TBA CASS
712 The Shivas - TBA CASS
713 V.A. - Now That's What I Call Burger Vol. 5 DIGI
714 Cretin Stompers - TBA CASS
715 Cutty Flam - Robot Heart CASS
716 Mystic Braves - Desert Island CASS
717 Sandy Pussy - TBA CASS
718 Rodriguez - Cold Fact CASS
719 Rodriguez - Coming From Reality CASS
720 The Black Angels - Passover CASS
721 The Black Angels - Directions To See A Ghost CASS
722 PiL - First Issue CASS
723 Honey Ltd - The Complete LHI Years CASS
724 Roky Erickson - Evil One CASS
725 Karen Dalton - In My Own Time CASS
726 Betty Davis - Betty Davis CASS
727 Jim Sullivan - UFO CASS
728 The Free Design - Kites Are Fun CASS
729 Big Boys - Lullabies Help The Brain Grow CASS
730 Big Boys - No Matter How Long The Line At The Cafeteria, There's Always A Seat CASS
731 Built To Spill - Ultimate Alternative Wavers CASS
732 AJ Davila - Terror Amor CASS
733 Ruthie - Joule EP CASS
734 Vision - Inertia LP/CD/CASS
736 Fade Up Fade Out Bye Bye - S/T CASS
737 Sloth Rust - TBA CASS
738 Outrageous Cherry - Digital Age LP/CD/CASS
739 Hound - Out Of Space CASS
740 Hound - Out Of Time CASS
741 Dwarves - Invented CASS/CD
742 Dwarves - Fun To Try 7"
743 John Doe - The Westerner CASS
744 Billy Changer / Tracy Bryant - 2 in 1 CASS
745 Rexx - Death and Other Ways To Be Artsy CASS
746 Elephant Stone - The Three Poisons CASS
747 The Cairo Gang - Live at Burger Vol. 3
748 Hector's Pets - Pet-o-Feelia CASS
749 The Garden - haha LP/CD/CASS
750 Grape St - Wallpaper LP/CD/CASS
751 The Universal Friend - Ghosts in the World CASS
752 V.A. - A Tribute to Lou Reed CASS
753 Melted Toys - S/T CASS
754 Guided By Voices - Cool Planet CASS
755 Cleaners From Venus - Return To Bohemia CASS
756 Wax Witches - From Hell CASS
757 Necros - Live in 85 CASS
758 The Rubinoos - Basement Tapes (Studio Demos 1980-81) CASS
759 Lees of Memory - Sisyphus Says CASS
760 White Fang - Chill Yourself - Fan Favorites 2009-2013 CASS
761 Michael Rault - Nothing Means Nothing CASS
762 Eli Pop - It's All Around CASS
763 The Sound Reasons - Til The End Of Time CASS
764 The Jackals - People CASS
765 Margo Guryan - Chopsticks CASS
766 Lenguas Largas - Come On In CASS
767 Joel Gion - Apple Bonkers CASS
768 LA Takedown - Top Down CASS
769 Jenny Lewis - The Voyager CASS
770 Yacht Club - Burnt Cream EP CASS
771 V.A. - Black Rain Entertainment Presents Welcome To The Darkside CASS
772 Prefab Messiahs - Keep Your Stupid Dreams Alive CASS/10"
773 The Yolks - Kings of Awesome CASS
774 Rodd Keith - TBA CASS
775 Gap Dream / Part Time - Split 7"
776 V.A. - Ambiguous Record Bag CASS
777 Pleiades - S/T LP/CASS
778 Sonnyskyes - I Kinda Like Living In The Sky CASS
779 Tha Club House Click - Ovaworked Undapaid CASS
780 Christian Bland & The Revelators - The Unseen Green Obscene CASS
781 Part Time - Late Night CASS
782 Spindrift - Exotic Detonation CASS
783 V.A. - Midtown Island Recordings CASS
784 Harsh Mistress - Harsh Mistress CASS
785 Jonah Ray - Hello, Mr Magic Plane Person, Hello CASS
786 V.A. - Burger Flashback - Self-Titled Mag CASS
787 David Vandervelde - Shadow Slides CASS
788 The Lemons - Hello LP/CD/CASS
789 Michael Rault - Living Daylight LP/CD/CASS
790 Weezer - Everything Will Be Alright In The End CASS
791 V.A. - Deep Secret Vol. 3 CASS
792 The Golden Dawn - Power Plant CASS
793 Corners - Maxed Out On Distractions CASS
794 White Mystery - Dubble Dragon CASS
795 La Femme - Psycho Tropical Berlin CASS
796 Methadone Kitty - Unconfined CASS
797 The Dogs - Fed Up CASS
798 Once and Future Band - Brain EP CASS
799 Mens Club - S/T CASS
800 Sarah Bethe Nelson - Fast Moving Clouds LP/CD/CASS
801 No Parents - May The Thirst Be With You CASS/LP/CD
802 Pink Mexico - Fool CASS
803 Gary With A Circle Around The A - Wish You Were Hair 7"
804 Gal Pals - Velvet Rut CASS
805 Big White - Teenage Dreams CASS/LP/CD
806 Daxls - Seven Inches And More CASS
807 Hinds / Parrots - Split 7"
808 The Parrots - Weed For The Parrots CASS
809 Promise - Promise CASS
810 Step-Panther - Strange But Nice CASS
811 Stan McMahon Band - Live in Salem CASS
812 Dengue Fever - Best Of CASS
813 La Sera - Hour of the Dawn CASS
814 Kim and the Created / Prettiest Eyes - Split CASS
815 Susan - The Eleanore Sessions CASS
816 Mope Grooves - Weird Girls CASS
817 The Tomb Weavers - Mystic Seer 7"
818 Further - Where Were You Then? 1991-97 CASS
819 The Tubs - Rag CASS
820 Those Pretty Wrongs - Lucky Guy 7"/CASS
821 Hello Kitty On Ice - Man With A Hole In His Throat 7"
822 Hot Knives - Hot Knives CASS
823 Labryyynth - Labryyynth CASS
824 Cool Ghouls - A Swirling Fire Burning Through the Rye CASS
825 Vaadat Charigim - Sinking As A Stone LP/CD/CASS
826 V.A. - BURGER 日本上陸 JAPAN CASS
827 Cosmonauts - Oh, You Know CASS
828 Pearl Charles - S/T CASS
829 Tijuana Panthers - Max Baker CASS
830 Cotillon - Cotillon CASS
831 Seth Pettersen - Sweet Reaper CASS
832 Telephone Lovers - TBA CASS
833 Mitchell Adam Johnson - Half Moon Lane CASS
834 US Bombs - Put Strength In The Final Blow CASS
835 The Stitches - 8 x 12 CASS
836 The Haiduks - 1968 CASS
837 Mr Twin Sister - S/T CASS
838 Geza X - You Goddam Kids! CASS
839 Rexx - I Really Tried To Save The Day CASS
840 V.A. - Burger Nuggets (Japan Only) CD
841 The Zoltars - The Zoltars CASS
842 Lucern Raze - Stockholm One CASS
843 Melted - Ziptripper CASS
844 Labryyynth - Labryyynth 7" LATHE CUT
845 Los Panky's - Collection LP/CASS
846 Dwarves - Lick It CD/CASS
847 Dwarves - Free Cocaine CD/CASS
848 Dwarves - Are Younger And Even Better Looking 2xLP/CD/CASS
849 Brian Jonestown Massacre - Aufheben CASS
850 Jaill - Brain Cream LP/CD/CASS
851 Night Beats - Who Sold My Generation CASS
852 DFL - Proud To Be CASS
853 Rikk Agnew Band - Learn CASS
854 Wyatt Blair - Point Of No Return LP/CD/CASS
855 Santoros - El Perdedor CASS
856 Distractor - Devotion CASS
857 Groundislava - Frozen Throne CASS
858 V.A. - BURGER 日本上陸 JAPAN 2 CASS
859 Les Marinellis - Île De Rêve CASS
860 Las Robertas - Days Unmade CASS
861 Fatal Jamz - Coverboy CASS
862 Colleen Green - I Want To Grow Up CASS
863 Margaret Doll Rod - Heartthrob Chassis CASS
864 Dancer - Singles CASS
865 La Lenguas - Tears In My Milkshake CASS
866 The Relationship - Oh Allen 7"/CASS
867 Jacco Gardner - Hypnophobia CASS
868 Laure Briard - Revelation CASS
869 Penetration Moon - Penetration Moon CD/CASS
870 Hinds - Burger CASS
871 Guantanamo Baywatch - Darling... It's Too Late CASS
872 Jon Spencer Blues Explosion - Freedom Tower - No Wave Dance Party 2015 CASS
873 Warm Soda - Symbolic Dream CASS
874 V.A. - Burger World Netherlands CASS
875 Part Time - Virgo's Maze 2xLP/CD/CASS
876 Mozes and the Firstborn - Great Pile Of Nothing LP/CD/CASS
877 Elephant Stone - ES3PRMX CASS
878 Swimmers - Silver Bullet CASS
879 The High Curbs - Marcelo Cleveland CASS
880 Tyranis - Out On Bail CASS
881 Moon Duo - Shadow Of The Sun CASS
882 The Smoking Trees - TST CASS
883 Dirty Ghosts - Cataract EP CASS
884 Vicky and the Vengents - You Used To Be My Baby CASS
885 Levitation Room - Ethos LP/CD/CASS
886 Puzzle - Silver Jungle CASS
887 Soviet - Ghosts CASS
888 Jessie Jones - Jessie Jones LP/CD/CASS
889 Together Pangea - The Phage EP 12"/CASS/CD
890 Brian Jonestown Massacre - Revelation CASS
891 Boys Age - Calm Time CASS
892 The Cairo Gang - Goes Missing CASS
893 Plastic Pinks - Sunnyside Rabbits CASS
894 Love Cop - Eat Yr Heart Out / Pop Magick Is Real 2FER CASS
895 V.A. - Best of the Burger Demo Box CASS
896 Tobin Sprout - Carnival Boy LP/CD/CASS
897 Tobin Sprout - Moonflower Plastic (Welcome To My Wigwam) LP/CD/CASS
898 Green Day - Dookie CASS
899 Tracy Bryant - Subterranean LP/CD/CASS
900 Gap Dream - This Is Gap Dream LP/CD/CASS
901 FREE WEED - Introducing... CASS
902 Walter - Get Well Soon CASS
903 Dead Ghosts - Love And Death And All The Rest LP/CD/CASS
904 V.A. - Beach Blvd CASS
905 Summer Twins - Limbo LP/CD/CASS
906 Fade Up Fade Out Bye Bye - Vol. 2 Pardom Mon Moi Hello Again Merci... LP/CD
907 Dissolve To Island - Moonrakers in the City Of Gold CASS
908 Shrouded Strangers - Teleport Beach CASS
909 Cosmonauts - Doom Generation LATHE CUT
910 Tomorrows Tulips - iNdy rock royalty comb 12"/CASS
911 Froth - Bleak LP/CD/CASS
912 Soko - My Dreams Dictate My Reality CASS
913 Las Rosas - Everyone Gets Exactly What They Want CASS
914 Nervous Gender - Music From Hell CASS
915 Unkle Funkle - Rub Rub Release / Picture of My Dick 2FER CASS
916 La Luz - Weirdo Shrine CASS
917 Sandy Nelson - Meet The Veebles CASS
918 Jigsaw Seen - Have A Wonderful Day CASS
919 Fidlar - Too CASS
920 Dead Meadow - S/T CASS
921 The Shivas - Better Off Dead CASS
922 Gymshorts - Wet Willy CASS
923 Massenger - Banshee EP CASS
924 Meercaz and the Visions - Meercaz and the Visions CASS
925 Peach Kelli Pop - iii LP/CD/CASS
926 Doug Tuttle - Doug Tuttle CASS
927 V.A. - Burger Boogaloo 2015 CASS
928 V.A. - Fuzzville #1 CASS
929 Electric Magpie - Begins CASS
930 Massenger - Peeling Out LP/CD/CASS
931 Samira's Infinite Summer - On My Mind 7"
932 Natural Child - Bodyswitchers LP
933 Death Valley Girls - Glow In The Dark LP/CD/CS
934 Diamond Hands - Diamond Hands CASS
935 Emotional - Ahh, The Name's Emotional, Baby! CASS/LP
936 The Sarcastic Assholes - Schrammit! CASS
937 Squirt Flower - Peace Questions Evil CASS
938 Faux Ferocious - Blues Legends CASS
939 Tommy Stinson - LMAO CASS
940 Boogarins - Manual CASS
941 The Gooch Palms - Novo's CASS
942 Pizza Time - Todo LP/CD/CASS
943 V.A. - Burger-A-Go-Go 2 Compilation CASS
944 Pete Dello And Friends - Into Your Ears CASS
945 Dinosaur Jr - Give A Glimpse Of What Yer Not CASS
946 The Stitches - Do The Jetset (Signed) LP
947 Jakob Danger - Jakob Danger CASS
948 Testors - Testors CASS
949 Berlin Brats - Berlin Brats CASS
950 Seth Bogart - Seth Bogart LP/CD/CS
951 Crofton / Pujol - Hapless Fools' Phantom Haircuts CASS
952 Tashaki Miyaki - The Dream CASS
953 Margo Guryan - Take A Picture CASS
954 Birdcloud - Tetnis CASS
955 Wax Witches - Memory Painting LP/CD/CASS
956 V.A. - KiliKiliVilla CASS
957 Gap Dream - S/T + Shine Your Light 2FER CASS
958 Shannon and the Clams - Gone By The Dawn CASS
959 Panaderia - Buena Onda CASS
960 Cassie Ramone - Christmas In Reno LP/CD/CASS
961 Dressy Bessy - Kingsized CASS
962 Thomas Mudrick - (((boing))) CASS
963 Winter - All The Things You Do DIGI
964 Melted - Live on KXLU CASS
965 The Bananas - Box Set 3xCASS
966 Kenny Rogers and First Edition - Live 1972 CASS
967 The Glass Family - Electric Band CASS
968 V.A. - Burger Headphones CASS
969 Flamin' Groovies - Crazy Macy 7"/CASS
970 The Quick - Live CASS
971 Virgin Kids - Greasewheel CASS
972 Patsy's Rats - Patsy's Rats CASS
973 Jason Simon - Familiar Haunts CASS
974 Swiftumz - Everybody Loves Chris CASS
975 Curtis Harding / Black Lips - I Don't Wanna Go Home 7"
976 Those Pretty Wrongs - Those Pretty Wrongs LP/CASS
977 No Parents - Hey Grandma and the Greatest Hits CASS
978 Grinning Ghosts - Yesterday Tomorrow CASS
979 Thee Oh Sees - Volume 3 CASS
980 Coromandelles - Late Bloomers' Bloomers CASS
981 TSOL - Beneath The Shadows CASS
982 Re-Animadores - Me Das Asco CASS
983 Boytoy - Grackle CASS
984 Jacuzzi Boys - Happy Damage CASS
985 Veruca Salt - Ghost Notes CASS
986 SWMRS - Drive North CASS
987 Fletcher C. Johnson - Lesson In Tenderness LP/CD/CASS
988 Pop Zeus - TBA 2xLP/CD/CASS
989 Flipper - Cassette Generic Flipper CASS
990 Adrian Street and the Pile Drivers - Shake, Wrestle and Roll LP/CD/CASS
991 La Sera - Music For Listening To Music To CASS
992 Ice Cold Slush - Messy Endings CASS
993 Hinds - Leave Me Alone CASS
994 White Night - Weird Night LP/CASS/CD
995 The Black Lips - Box Set 4xCASS
996 The Side Eyes - The Side Eyes CASS
997 Feels - Feels CASS
998 The MnMs - Melts In Your Ears LP/CASS/CD
999 The Wizards - Purple Magic LP/CS
1000 The Burger Buddy CASSETTE PLAYER
1001 Glitterbust - Glitterbust LP/CASS/CD
1002 Adult Books - Running from the Blows CASS
1003 Apache - Alcatraz CASS/LP
1004 Dengue Fever - The Deepest Lake CASS
1005 The Smoking Trees - The Archer and The Bull LP/CD/CASS
1006 Javier Escovido - Kicked Out Of Eden CASS
1007 The Gooch Palms - Introverted Extroverts CASS
1008 Tracy Chase - Tracy Chase CASS
1009 The Meow Twins - Skin CASS
1010 The Memories - Royal United Song Service LP/CD/CASS
1011 Mean Jeans - Tight New Dimension CASS
1012 Wu-Wu - Limelite CASS
1013 Bleached - Welcome The Worms CASS
1014 Mozes and the Firstborn / Roland Cosio - Split 7"
1015 Yuppies Indeed - Stropharia CASS
1016 Audacity - Hyper Vessels CASS
1017 Sunflower Bean - Human Ceremony CASS
1018 Fat White Family - Songs For Our Mothers CASS
1019 Juniore - Juniore CASS
1020 Cosmonauts - A-OK LP/CD/CASS
1021 Lees of Memory - Unnecessary Evil CASS
1022 White Mystery - Outta Control CASS
1023 Explorers Club - Together CASS
1024 The Blank Tapes - Ojos Rojos CASS
1025 Danny James Etc - TBA LP/CD/CASS
1026 Kim Fowley - Live At Burger Records CASS
1027 Dallas Acid - Original Soundtrack CASS
1028 Lovely Bad Things - Teenage Grown Ups LP/CD/CASS
1029 Laure Briard - Sur la Piste de Danse CASS
1030 Channel - Channel CASS
1031 Dead Meadow - Howls From The Hills CASS
1032 Scully - Scully CASS
1033 Roya - Roya LP/CD/CASS
1034 Guitar Wolf - T-Rex From a Tiny Space Yojouhan CASS
1035 Sarah Bethe Nelson - Oh, Evolution LP/CD/CASS
1036 Thee Commons - Loteria Tribal CASS/CD
1037 Psycotic Pineapple - Live CASS
1038 Turbonegro - Special Education CASS
1039 Distractor / Tracy Bryant - Devotion 7" LATHE CUT
1040 Big Star - Box Set 3xCASS
1041 Basil & Rogers - Basil & Rogers CASS
1042 The Toms - The Toms CASS
1043 V.A. - Best of Sire Records Vol 1 CASS
1044 Amyl And The Sniffers - Big Attraction CASS
1045 Drinking Flowers - New Swirled Order CASS
1046 San Pedro El Cortez - Un Poco Mas De Luz CASS
1047 Berlin Brats - Tropically Hot b/w Psychotic 7"
1048 V.A. - Burger Boogaloo 2016 CASS
1049 The Jigsaw Seen - For The Discriminating Completist CASS
1050 Tobin Sprout - The Universe And Me LP/CD/CS
1051 Doug Tuttle - It Calls On Me CASS
1052 Dog Party - 'Til You're Mine CASS
1053 White Night - Demos CASS
1054 BTs - Bustin' Out CASS
1055 Cool Ghouls - Animal Races CASS
1056 Fatlip - The Loneliest Punk CASS
1057 Hundred Visions - Brutal Pueblo CASS
1058 Thor - Keep The Dogs Away CASS
1059 Dandy Warhols - TBA CASS
1060 Elephant Stone - Ship Of Fools LP/CD/CASS
1061 Freezing Hands - II CASS
1062 Hammered Satin - Strawberries N Cream 7"
1063 The Exbats - A Guide To Health Issues Affecting Rescue Hens CASS
1064 Duchess Says - Anthologie Des 3 Perchoirs / In A Fung Day T! 2FER CASS
1065 Star Spangles - TBA 2FER CASS
1066 The Tyde - Darren 4 CASS
1067 David Kusworth - All The Heartbreak Stories CASS
1068 David Kusworth and the Bounty Hunters - Wives, Weddings, And Roses CASS
1069 Tony Price - I Prefer Coca Cola CASS
1070 Trementina - 810 LP/CD/CS
1071 Butterscotch Cathedral - Butterscotch Cathedral CASS
1072 Tiger Tank - Tiger Tank CASS
1073 Soaked - Don't Wanna Wake Up Today CASS
1074 Z-Malibu Kids - TBA CASS
1075 VAJJ - TBA CASS
1076 Mr Elevator and the Brain Hotel - When The Morning Greets You CASS
1077 Black Randy And The Metrosquad – Pass The Dust, I Think I'm Bowie CASS
1078 Beat Mark - Contemporary Is Temporary CASS
1079 Cotillon - The Afternoons CASS
1080 V.A. - Burger's Best Buds 420 Comp CASS
1081 The Eves - E.P. CASS
1082 The Mystery Lights - The Mystery Lights CASS
1083 Jacuzzi Boys - Ping Pong CASS
1084 Todays Hits - Todays Hits CASS
1085 Outrageous Cherry - I Believe In Sunshine 7"
1086 Thee Oh Sees - A Weird Exits CASS
1087 Thee Oh Sees - Live in San Francisco CASS
1088 Thee Oh Sees - An Odd Entrances CASS
1089 Love Cop - Higher Outliers CASS
1090 Sam Coffey and the Iron Lungs - Sam Coffey and the Iron Lungs LP/CD/CASS
1091 Tiny Tim - Tiny Tim's America CASS
1092 Lenguas Largas - TBA CASS
1093 Easy Love - Easy Love CASS
1094 Yea-Ming and the Rumours - Baby Blue DIGI
1095 The Glass Family - TBA 7"
1096 La BOA - TBA CASS
1097 Johnny Thunders and the Heartbreakers - LAMF Live at the Village Gate CASS
1098 Panaderia - Genial CASS
1099 The Blondes - The Blondes CASS
1100 Neon King Kong - TBA CASS
1101 The Flytraps - Sunset Strip RIP LP/CASS
1102 V.A. - Burger 2017 Sampler CD
1103 Baby Shakes - Turn It Up CASS
1104 Cutty Flam - Shapes Of Sound CASS
1105 Iggy and the Stooges - Gimme Some Skin CASS
1106 The Courtneys - The Courtneys II CASS
1107 Thelma and the Sleaze - Somebody's Doin' Somethin' CASS
1108 J. Walker and the Crossguards - J. Walker and the Crossguards CASS
1109 Lajoie/Tuttle - American Primate CASS
1110 The Stitches - TBA LP/CD/CASS
1111 Le Shok - We Are Electrocution LP/CD/CASS
1112 V.A. - Burger World Israel CASS
1113 Blind Matty - Gringo! CASS
1114 Tracy Bryant - A Place For Nothing And Everything In Its Place LP/CD/CASS
1115 Sufis - After Hours LP/CD/CS
1116 V.A. - Burger World Mexico CASS
1117 V.A. - Best Of IAP Records CASS
1118 V.A. - Burger World Japan CASS
1119 Saba Lou - Planet Enigma CASS
1120 Vaadat Charigim - TBA LP/CD/CASS
1121 V.A. - Burger World France CASS
1122 The Parrots - Los Niños Sin Miedo CASS
1123 Puzzle - Laying In The Sand CASS
1124 Suburban Nightmare - Hard Day's Nightmare LP/CASS
1125 Once And Future Band - Once And Future Band CASS
1126 The Detours - TBA CASS
1127 La Femme - Mystére CASS
1128 Mind Meld - Mind Meld CASS
1129 Redd Kross - Oh Canada CASS
1130 Vanilla - Vanilla CASS
1131 BRGRTV x Burger Radio Themes 7"
1132 Kikagaku Moyo - House in the Tall Grass CASS
1133 Holly Overton with Midnight People - Every New Day CASS
1134 El Pan Blanco - Droga CASS
1135 Damaged Bug - Bunker Funk CASS
1136 Thee Oh Sees - Box Set CASS
1137 Mattiel - Whites Of Their Eyes 7"
1138 Mentallica - Mentallica CASS
1139 Frankie and the Witch Fingers - Heavy Roller CASS
1140 The Heartlights - Oh Dear CASS
1141 The Garden - U Want The Scoop? EP CASS
1142 Sweet Nobody - Loud Songs For Quiet People CASS
1143 Beechwood - Songs From The Land Of Nod CASS
1144 The Regrettes - Feel Your Feelings Fool! CASS
1145 The Invisible Teardrops - Cry Cry Cry CASS
1146 Or Edry - Kidod CASS
1147 Marie Mathématique - Tous Vos Lendemains Dès Aujourd'hui CASS
1148 Las Robertas - Waves of the New CASS
1149 The Broken Hearts - Lost In Little Tokyo CASS
1150 LA Law - Law and Order LP/CD/CASS
1151 Redd Kross - Teen Babes From Monsanto CASS
1152 The Shivas - Turn Me On EP CASS
1153 Plastic Pinks - All's Allright EP CASS
1154 Will Sprott - Ten Fingers CASS
1155 V.A. - Burger Records Sounds for X-Girl CASS
1156 William Burroughs - Let Me Hang You CASS
1157 Reckling - Reckling CASS
1158 Thee Commons - TBA CASS
1159 The Loons - DIamonds, Garbage And Gold CASS
1160 Luther Russell - Selective Memories CASS
1161 DFL - The Tape Show CASS
1162 Cannery Terror - Bipolar Babies CASS
1163 V.A. - Volcom Cyber Singles DIGI/CASS
1164 AJ Davila - TBA CASS
1165 Billy Changer - Best Of Fortune EP CASS
1166 HeartsRevolution - Revolution Rising CASS
1167 Thee MVPs - Receiver EP CASS
1168 The Grinning Ghosts - EP 1 CASS
1169 The Jackets - Way Out / Shadows Of Sound 2FER CASS
1170 Paul Williams - Someday LP/CD/CASS
1171 Hammered Satin - Upwards Spiral 7"
1172 Black Sea - Disappointing Sunset CASS
1173 Veneer - Yesterday's Friends CASS
1174 Flamin' Groovies - What The Hell's Goin' On 7"
1175 Mattiel - Mattiel LP/CD/CS
1176 Vincent Kircher - Am I Ghost CASS
1177 The Side Eyes - So Sick CASS
1178 Discoelasti - Discoelasti CASS
1179 V.A. - Burger World Australia CASS
1180 Dwarves - Take Back The Night LP/CD/CASS
1181 Flamin' Groovies - Fantastic Plastic CASS
1182 Soda Lilies - TBA CASS
1183 Eyelids - OR CASS
1184 Traumahelikopter - Competition Stripe CASS
1185 The Pandoras - Hey! It's The Pandoras LP/CD/CASS
1186 Bad Zeppelin - Bad Songs CASS
1187 Sweet Reaper - Street Sweeper CASS
1188 Winter - Jaded DIGI
1189 El Cortez - Temple of Doombia CASS
1190 Teenage Burritos - TBA LP/CD/CASS
1191 Panaderia - Jeanette EP CASS
1192 V.A. - Noar Avud 2 CASS
1193 Lola Pistola - Curfew CASS
1194 Scott Yoder - A Fool Aloof CASS
1195 Samira Winter - Estrella Magica LP/CD/CASS
1196 Puzzle - Tighten The Reigns CASS
1197 Jerry Rogers - Raspberry Radio CASS
1198 Golden Boots - Halt CASS
1199 Peachfuzz - On Pop Of The World CASS
1200 PMS And The Moodswings - PMS And The Moodswings LP/CD/CASS
1201 Blood Stone - Doomed Forever CASS
1202 Brenton Wood - Oogum Boogum CASS
1203 Brenton Wood - Baby You Got It CASS
1204 Frankie and the Witch Fingers - Brain Telephone CASS
1205 Dr. Boogie - Gotta Get Back To... New York City CASS
1205 Harsh Mistress - TBA CASS
1206 The Exbats - I Got The Hots For Charlie Watts CASS
1207 Crystales - Crystales CASS
1208 Prefab Messiahs - Psychsploitation... Today! CASS
1209 Spike Vincent - Live CASS
1210 Outrageous Cherry - Meet You In The Shadows LP/CD/CASS
1211 No Parents - Still Thirsty CASS
1212 Sgt Saltpeter - Tales From The Toilet LP/CASS
1213 Dallas Acid - Spa Hunter CASS
1214 The Whips - City Wide Special CASS
1215 Krayon - Krayon CASS
1216 Jeff McDonald - Jeff McDonald CASS
1217 Oh Sees - Orc CASS
1218 OCS - Memory Of A Cut Off Head CASS
1219 VNLVX - In Unlux CASS
1220 Prude Boys - TBA CASS
1221 Donnie Emerson - TBA 7"
1222 Distractor - This Time I Got It Figured Out LP/CD/CASS
1223 V.A. - Midtown Island Studio Vol 2 CASS
1224 Bart Davenport - TBA CASS
1225 The Salvation Army - Live LP
1226 Jarebear - TBA CD/CASS
1227 Redd Kross - Hot Issue LP/CD/CASS
1228 Turbonegro - RockNRoll Machine LP/CD/CASS
1229 Mean Jeans - Jingles CASS
1230 Vitamin - TBA 7"
1231 V.A. - Burger World Germany CASS
1232 Jack Drag - TBA CASS
1233 Timmy's Organism - TBA LP/CD/CASS
1234 Mozes and the Firstborn - TBA LP/CD/CASS
1235 Pleiades - 3 LP/CD/CASS
1236 MIEN - TBA CASS
1237 Dios - TBA LP/CD/CASS
1238 Peach Kelli Pop - IV CASS
1239 Enjoy - TBA LP/CD/CASS
1240 V.A. - Burger-A-Go-Go Tour 2018 CASS
1241 CHAI - Pink CD/CASS
1242 Cheap Tissue - TBA CASS

References

External links
Burger Records

Discographies of American record labels